Letnica is an industrial district of the city of Gdańsk in northern Poland. It lies in the northern part of the city, and contains the Municipal Stadium, the city's largest football venue hosting several Euro 2012 games.

Gallery

See also
List of neighbourhoods of Gdańsk

References

Districts of Gdańsk